Mate crime is a form of crime in which a perpetrator befriends a vulnerable person with the intention of then exploiting the person financially, physically or sexually. "Mate" (British slang for 'friend') crime perpetrators take advantage of the isolation and vulnerability of their victim to win their confidence. Research has highlighted common factors in mate crime and hate crime.

In publicity regarding mate crime, Trafford Clinical Commissioning Group states:

Victims of mate crime may be enticed into committing criminal acts themselves and taking the blame so as to protect the real perpetrator, although the vulnerable person may lack the mental capacity themselves to be treated as a criminal. The National Autistic Society has noted that "Many people with autism desperately want to have friends, but may struggle to know the best ways of starting and maintaining friendships" and are therefore at risk of mate crime abuse.

In 2011 a serious case review following the death of Gemma Hayter found "clear evidence that Hayter was susceptible to abuse, as it was known she had suffered 'mate crime' regularly over some time" and noted that "an overall lack of thoroughness and information-sharing led to 'a number of missed opportunities' to find out what was happening more generally in her life and the company she was keeping".

In the United Kingdom, the Crown Prosecution Service (CPS) advises its staff to avoid using the term "mate crime":

When there is a suspicion that mate crime has been committed the police should be notified. Local procedures for safeguarding vulnerable adults should also be followed.

See also
 Cuckooing – a practice where criminals befriend a vulnerable person, and then exploit their home to commit crime such as drug dealing
 Murder of Gemma Hayter
 Murder of Jennifer Daugherty

References

External links
 The Real Change Challenge:Mate Crime: A Challenge for the Police, Safeguarding and Criminal Justice Agencies - Association for Real Change
 Mate and hate crime - Mencap
Hate crime
Disability